Sturminster Newton United Football Club is a football club based in Sturminster Newton, Dorset, England, currently playing in the . The club is affiliated to the Dorset County Football Association and is a FA Charter Standard Community Club. Currently have 9 youth teams ranging from under 8s to under 16s,playing in the dorset mini soccer league and dorset youth league.

History
In 1874 the club, which was then known as Panthers FC, and based in Blandford Forum, playing in brown and yellow hoops, became the first ever club from the West Country to participate in the FA Cup, reaching the second round on three occasions. In 1877–78, they played the legendary Wanderers in the first round, but lost 9–1. In the 1890s, their name was changed to Sturminster St Marys, with the current name adopted in 1945.

They were among the founding members of the Dorset Combination in 1957, having played previously in the Dorset League. After leaving the league due to financial difficulties in 1960, they played in the lower Dorset Senior League until they rejoined the Combination in 1972. They remained in that competition (since 2002 renamed the Dorset Premier League) until 2011 when they were relegated to the Dorset Senior League, during which time they won the Combination cup twice, in 1981 and 1995. They moved from a public recreation ground to their own stadium at Honeymead Lane in 1996.

In 2011–12 under manager , in his first full season in charge, the club won the Dorset Senior Trophy with a 1–0 win over Parley Sports at Wimborne Town.

They are currently being managed by Nick Squires.

Ground

Sturminster Newton United play their games at Barnetts Field, Honeymead Lane. The ground has a clubhouse and bar for Home fans and receives an attendance of around 50 people each week in the 600 capacity stadium.  It has a sheltered and open terrace with floodlit pitch.  The club moved to this ground in 1996. Many famous games have occurred here including the cherries famous 3-1 win over local rivals Okeford United in the 2011 Dorset Senior Trophy.

Club honours

Dorset League Division One:
 Winners: 1971–72
Dorset Senior Trophy:
 Winners: 2011–12
Dorset Combination League Cup:
 Winners: 1980–81, 1995–96
Dorset Senior Amateur Cup:
 Runners-up: 1961–62
Dorset Junior Cup:
 Runners-up: 1910–11
Mark Frowd Memorial Cup winners 2016

Club records
Best league performance: 4th in Dorset Combination, 1983–84 (NB records prior to 1979 are not available)
Best FA Cup performance: Second Round, 1875–76, 1876–77, 1878–79 (as Panthers) – no modern participation
Highest Attendance: 600 vs Weymouth in 1986
 Top Scorer In clubs history- 
 Highest transfer fee received

Former players
1. Players that have played/managed in the football league or any foreign equivalent to this level (i.e. fully professional league).
2. Players with full international caps.
Ken Wookey

References

External links

www.snufc.co.uk

 
Association football clubs established in 1871
1871 establishments in England
Dorset Premier Football League
Dorset Football League
Sturminster Newton
Football clubs in Dorset